Jonas Kamprad (born March 1966) is a London-based Swedish billionaire, the son of IKEA founder Ingvar Kamprad.

Early life
Jonas Kamprad was born in March 1966. He is the 2nd son of IKEA founder Ingvar Kamprad. Kamprad studied industrial and furniture design in École cantonale d'art de Lausanne (ECAL) in Lausanne, Switzerland.

Career
Together with his two brothers, he owns Ikano Group, which manages Ikea's real estate, insurance and financial service businesses.

Personal life
Kamprad is married, with two children, and lives in London, England.

References

1966 births
Living people
Swedish billionaires
Swedish people of German descent
Swedish people of Czech descent
Swedish expatriates in Switzerland
Swedish expatriates in the United Kingdom
21st-century Swedish businesspeople